Greg Montesi (born April 15, 1959) is an American rower. He competed at the 1984 Summer Olympics and the 1988 Summer Olympics.

References

External links
 

1959 births
Living people
American male rowers
Olympic rowers of the United States
Rowers at the 1984 Summer Olympics
Rowers at the 1988 Summer Olympics
Place of birth missing (living people)